Constance Purdy (August 3, 1887 – April 1, 1960) was an American film actress and classical music performer.

Early life 
Purdy was born in St. Louis, Missouri on August 3, 1887 to American railroad executive Thomas C. Purdy (April 13, 1846; June 17, 1924) and Janet Campbell Purdy (1847; April 10, 1892). As a young girl she reportedly sang for Tsar Nicholas in Russia. At the age of 16 Purdy studied voice in Paris, rooming with future opera diva and film actress Geraldine Farrar, before embarking on a career as a contralto singer, lecturer, and translator of traditional Russian songs. Her friend and personal representative Mabel F. Hammond, often accompanied her on piano.

Career 
Purdy did not enter into film acting until 1934, with her first appearance, uncredited, being in the film Pursued starring Rosemary Ames. The 1930s saw her in four film appearances, only one of which was credited, that being in the 1935 film Thunder in the Night starring Edmund Lowe and Karen Morley. Most of her film appearances were in the 1940s, playing fifty different roles from 1940 to 1949, of which only six were credited. During the 1950s she had four film appearances, one of which was credited, and one television series appearance. She appeared in a 1951 episode of the TV series The Lone Ranger entitled "Trouble at Black Rock." During this period Purdy remained active in music circles, teaming up with Grace Widney Mabee, chair of the National Film Music Council, to launch Film Music Notes, and serving as the journal's co-editor.

Death 
Purdy retired after 1952, and was living in Los Angeles at the time of her death on April 1, 1960, aged 72. Her gravesite is at Forest Lawn Memorial Park in Glendale.

Partial filmography

References

External links

1887 births
1960 deaths
People from Kansas
American film actresses
20th-century American actresses